My Children and I (German: Meine Kinder und ich) is a 1955 West German comedy drama film directed by Wolfgang Schleif and starring Grethe Weiser, Doris Kirchner and Claus Biederstaedt.  It was shot at the Templehof Studios in West Berlin. The film's sets were designed by the art directors Mathias Matthies and Ellen Schmidt.

Synopsis
When she is unexpectedly widowed, Mutz Hartmann needs to support her children and takes up a job as a taxi driver. Meanwhile her two eldest children try to make their way in the world.

Cast
 Grethe Weiser as Mutz Hartmann
 Doris Kirchner as Gabriele 'Gaby' Roecker
 Claus Biederstaedt as Günther Hartmann
 Hans Nielsen as Wilhelm Roecker
 Paul Dahlke as Otto Baumann
 Barbara Rost as 	Monika Hartmann
 Roland Kaiser as 	Peter Hartmann
 Karin Volquartz as 	Gisela
 Alexander Engel as 	Herr Knirsch
 Emil Suhrmann as 	Dr. Sibelius 
 Wolf Martini as 	Herr Strelow
 Erna Sellmer as 	Frieda
 Blandine Ebinger as 	Untermieterin
 Willi Rose as 	Taxifahrer
 Fritz Wagner as 	Erpresser
 Boy Gobert as 	Charlie Scheller - Manager

References

Bibliography
 Bliersbach, Gerhard. So grün war die Heide: der deutsche Nachkriegsfilm in neuer Sicht. Beltz, 1985.
 Bock, Hans-Michael & Bergfelder, Tim. The Concise CineGraph. Encyclopedia of German Cinema. Berghahn Books, 2009.

External links 
 

1955 films
1955 comedy films
German comedy films
West German films
1950s German-language films
Films directed by Wolfgang Schleif
1950s German films
Films shot at Tempelhof Studios

de:Meine Kinder und ich